The Kim Possible soundtrack is an album released on July 22, 2003 by Walt Disney Records. It contains songs from the Disney Channel series Kim Possible. The songs here are used as scores in the series, and some songs inspired by the show. The voice actress for the title character, Christy Carlson Romano, sings a song for the soundtrack, as well as a rap from Ron Stoppable (Will Friedle) and Rufus (Nancy Cartwright). There are various artists on the soundtrack including Aaron Carter and Smash Mouth. Walt Disney Records released a second "Kim-Proved" version of the soundtrack on March 22, 2005.

List of songs

Original version - 2003

 "CALL ME, BEEP ME! (The Kim Possible Song)" - Christina Milian
 "It's Just You" - LMNT
 "I'm Ready" - Angela Michael
 "Get Up on Ya Feet" - Aaron Carter
 "Celebration" - Jump5
 "Say The Word" - Kim Possible (Christy Carlson Romano)
 "Summertime Guys" - Nikki Cleary
 "This Year" - A*Teens
 "Work it Out" -  Brassy
 "E! Is for Everybody" - Cooler Kids
 "Come On, Come On" - Smash Mouth
 "The Naked Mole Rap" - Ron Stoppable (Will Friedle) and Rufus (Nancy Cartwright)
 "CALL ME, BEEP ME! (The Kim Possible Song)" (Tony Phillips Remix) - Christina Milian

Kim-Proved version - 2005
 "CALL ME, BEEP ME! (The Kim Possible Song)" - Christina Milian
 "It's Just You" - LMNT
 "I'm Ready" - Angela Michael
 "Get Up on Ya Feet" - Aaron Carter
 "Say The Word" - Kim Possible (Christy Carlson Romano)
 "Celebration" - Jump5
 "Could It Be" - Christy Carlson Romano
 "Summertime Guys" - Nikki Cleary
 "E! Is for Everybody" - Cooler Kids
 "The Naked Mole Rap" - Ron Stoppable (Will Friedle) and Rufus (Nancy Cartwright)
 "Come On, Come On" - Smash Mouth
 "Rappin' Drakken" - Dr. Drakken (John DiMaggio)
 "CALL ME, BEEP ME! (The Kim Possible Song)" (Tony Phillips Remix) - Christina Milian
 "CALL ME, BEEP ME! (Movie Mix)" - Angela Michael

Italian version - 2006
 "CALL ME, BEEP ME! (The Kim Possible Song)" - Christina Milian
 "Wake Up" - Hilary Duff
 "Superstar" - Jamelia
 "It's Just You" - LMNT
 "Get Up on Ya Feet" - Aaron Carter
 "Io ci sarò" - Kim Possible (Valentina Mari)
 "Celebration" - Jump5
 "Un amore nascosto" - Kim Possible (Valentina Mari)
 "Summertime Guys" - Nikki Cleary
 "E! Is for Everybody" - Cooler Kids
 "La talpa senza pelo" - Ron Stoppable (Marco Vivio) e Rufus (Tatiana Dessi)
 "Get Your Shine On" - Jesse McCartney
 "Lavati la testa" - Dott. Drakken (Ambrogio Colombo)
 "CALL ME, BEEP ME! (The Kim Possible Song)" (Tony Phillips Remix) - Christina Milian

German version - 2006
 "CALL ME, BEEP ME! (The Kim Possible Song)" - Banaroo
 "Wake Up" - Hilary Duff
 "Superstar" - Jamelia
 "It's Just You" - LMNT
 "Get Up on Ya Feet" - Aaron Carter
 "Sag Nur Ein Wort" - Marius Claren/Saskia Tanfal
 "Celebration" - Jump5
 "Kann Das Sein" - Saskia Tanfal
 "Summertime Guys" - Nikki Cleary
 "E Is for Everybody" - Cooler Kids
 "Nacktmull-Rap" - Marius Claren/Ron Stoppable/Stefan Krause/Rufus
 "Come On Come On" - Smash Mouth
 "Get Your Shine on" - Jesse McCartney
 "Schäumen, Spülen Und Parier'n" - Dr Drakken/Jan Spitzer
 "CALL ME, BEEP ME! (The Kim Possible Song)" (Tony Phillips Remix) - Christina Milian

French version - 2006
 "Mission Kim Possible" - Priscilla Betti
 "Wake Up" - Hilary Duff
 "Ma Vie" (French version) - Amine
 "Superstar" - Jamelia
 "It's Just You" - LMNT
 "Get Up on Ya Feet" - Aaron Carter
 "Suffit d'un Mot" - Mery
 "Celebration" - Jump5
 "Dis Pourquoi" - Veronica Antico
 "Summertime Guys" - Nikki Cleary
 "E Is for Everybody" - Cooler Kids
 "Le Rap Du Taupinet Tondu" - Donald Reignoux as Robin Trépide (Ron Stoppable) & Michel Costa as Rufus
 "Come On Come On" - Smash Mouth
 "Get Your Shine on" - Jesse McCartney
 "Mousse, Rince, Obéi" - Michel Elias as Dr. Drakken
 "CALL ME, BEEP ME! (The Kim Possible Song)" - Christina Milian
 "Code S-pion : La mission" - Fabienne Darnaud & Joan Faggianelli

Songs from Kim Possible - 2020 
 "CALL ME, BEEP ME! (The Kim Possible Song)" - Christina Milian
 "It's Just You" - LMNT
 "I'm Ready" - Angela Michael
 "Get Up on Ya Feet" - Aaron Carter
 "Say The Word" - Kim Possible (Christy Carlson Romano)
 "Summertime Guys" - Nikki Cleary
"This Year" - A*Teens
"E Is for Everybody" - Cooler Kids
"Come On, Come On" - Smash Mouth
"The Naked Mole Rap" - Ron Stoppable (Will Friedle) and Rufus (Nancy Cartwright)
"CALL ME, BEEP ME! (The Kim Possible Song)" (Tony Phillips Remix) - Christina Milian
 "Could It Be" - Christy Carlson Romano
 "CALL ME, BEEP ME! (Movie Mix)" - Angela Michael
 "Rappin' Drakken" - Dr. Drakken (John DiMaggio)

Differences
Differences from the original soundtrack to the Kim-Proved version are as follows:

The songs "This Year" by A*TEENS and "Work It Out" by Brassy on the original are replaced by "Could it Be" by Christy Carlson Romano and "Rappin' Drakken" by Dr. Drakken on the Kim-Proved version. The "CALL ME, BEEP ME! (Movie Mix)" by Angela Michael is added to the Kim-Proved version.

The 2020 version is a digital release. Previously, only a few tracks were available for streaming. These included "CALL ME, BEEP ME! (The Kim Possible Song)" by Christina Milian on the album "Your Favorite Songs from 100 Disney Channel Original Movies," "Summertime Guys" by Nikki Cleary on her self-titled album and "The Naked Mole Rap" by Ron Stoppable (Will Friedle) and Rufus (Nancy Cartwright) on the album "Disney Classics." A shorter version of "E Is for Everybody" by Cooler Kids and a version of "Come On, Come On" by Smash Mouth with slight variations in the lyrics were also available. "Celebration" by Jump5 and "Work it Out" by Brassy are not included on this version. "Get Up on Ya Feet" by Aaron Carter, "This Year" by A*Teens and these releases of "Summertime Guys" by Nikki Cleary, "E Is for Everybody" by Cooler Kids and "Come On, Come On" by Smash Mouth are only available with the purchase of the entire album as of the time of writing.

Charts

References 

Kim Possible
Television animation soundtracks
2005 soundtrack albums
Walt Disney Records soundtracks